Ajjarni  is a village in the southern state of Karnataka, India. It is located in the Sirsi taluk of Uttara Kannada district.

See also
 Uttara Kannada
 Districts of Karnataka
 Karwar
 Mangalore

References

External links
 

Villages in Uttara Kannada district